Mikołaj Torosowicz (in Ukrainian: Миколай Торосович, Mykolai Torosovych; born 1605 in Lviv – October 24, 1681), was the first Armenian Catholic bishop of Lviv.

Biography

Torosowicz was born in Lviv in a wealthy Yakov Torosovich's Armenian apostolic merchant family. At that time, the Armenians of Galicia were under ecclesiastical jurisdiction of the patriarch of the See of Echmiadzin, in Armenia, then under Persian rule.

With religious vocation, he was sent by his parents to Istanbul. and was ordained a priest in 1626 in Istanbul, and on 8 January 1627 Torosowicz was appointed bishop of Lviv of the Armenian Apostolic Church.

On October 24, 1630 Torosowicz made a profession of faith in a Carmelite Catholic church of Discalced Carmelites, and entered himself along with his diocese in communion with the Catholic Church. The union was confirmed by the Holy See on November 8 of the same year, and Torosowicz became the first Armenian Catholic archbishop of Lviv.

On 22 May 1635 Torosowicz made a new confession of faith to the Pope Urban VIII in Rome, and was named Metropolitan of Lviv, with jurisdiction over all Armenians from Poland, Moldova and Wallachia. It was also he who led the Theatines to Lviv. Torosowicz was named knight of the Order of St. Michael and the Order of Jesus and Mary.

He died on October 24, 1681 at the age of 76.

See also

 Armenian Catholic Archeparchy of Lviv,
 Armenian Catholic Church

Bibliography

 Samuel Orgelbrand, ed. (1867). Encyklopedia Powszechna (1st edition) (in Polish) 25. pp. 388–390.
 Sadok Barącz, Living of the famous Armenians in Poland, Lvov, 1856.

References

External links
 http://www.catholic-hierarchy.org/bishop/btorosow.html
 http://m.pidruchniki.com/19720822/religiyeznavstvo/diyalnist_yepiskopa_torosovicha
 http://www.wbc.poznan.pl/dlibra/docmetadata?id=72173&dirids=1&
 http://www.wiki.ormianie.pl/index.php/Mikołaj_Torosowicz

1605 births
1681 deaths
Armenian Catholic bishops
Bishops of the Armenian Apostolic Church
Converts to Eastern Catholicism from Oriental Orthodoxy
Clergy from Lviv
People from Ruthenian Voivodeship
17th-century Eastern Catholic archbishops
Polish people of Armenian descent